The two-step flow of communication model says that most people form their opinions under the influence of opinion leaders, who in turn are influenced by the mass media. In contrast to the one-step flow of the hypodermic needle model or magic bullet theory, which holds that people are directly influenced by mass media, according to the two-step flow model, ideas flow from mass media to opinion leaders, and from them to a wider population. Opinion leaders pass on their own interpretation of information in addition to the actual media content.

Basic overview 
The theory is based on a 1940s study on social influence that states that media effects are indirectly established through the personal influence of opinion leaders. The majority of people receive much of their information and are influenced by the media secondhand, through the personal influence of opinion leaders.

Concept 
The two-step model says that most people are not directly influenced by mass media, and instead form their opinions based on opinion leaders who interpret media messages and put them into context. Opinion leaders are those initially exposed to a specific media content, and who interpret it based on their own opinion. They then begin to infiltrate these opinions through the general public who become "opinion followers". These "opinion leaders" gain their influence through more elite media as opposed to mainstream mass media. In this process, social influence is created and adjusted by the ideals and opinions of each specific "elite media" group, and by these media group's opposing ideals and opinions and in combination with popular mass media sources. Therefore, the leading influence in these opinions is primarily a social persuasion.

About 
The two-step flow of communication model hypothesizes that ideas flow from mass media to opinion leaders, and from them to a wider population.  It was first introduced by sociologist Paul Lazarsfeld et al. in 1944 and elaborated by Elihu Katz and Lazarsfeld in 1955 and subsequent publications. Melvin DeFleur and Sheoron Lowery argue the book was much more than a simple research report: it was an effort to interpret the authors' research within a framework of conceptual schemes, theoretical issues, and research findings drawn broadly from the scientific study of small groups. Unlike the hypodermic needle model, which considers mass media effects to be direct, the two-step flow model stresses human agency.

For example, in the field of science communication, Matthew Nisbet describes the use of opinion leaders as intermediaries between scientists and the public as a way to reach the public via trained individuals who are more closely engaged with their communities, such as "teachers, business leaders, attorneys, policymakers, neighborhood leaders, students, and media professionals." Examples of initiatives that take this approach include Science & Engineering Ambassadors, sponsored by the National Academy of Sciences, and Science Booster Clubs, coordinated by the National Center for Science Education.

According to Lazarsfeld and Katz, mass media information is channeled to the "masses" through opinion leadership. The people with most access to media, and having a more literate understanding of media content, explain and diffuse the content to others.

Based on the two-step flow hypothesis, the term "personal influence" came to illustrate the process intervening between the media's direct message and the audience's reaction to that message. Opinion leaders tend to be similar to those they influence—based on personality, interests, demographics, or socio-economic factors. These leaders tend to influence others to change their attitudes and behaviors. The two-step theory refined the ability to predict how media messages influence audience behavior and explains why certain media campaigns do not alter audiences' attitudes. This hypothesis provided a basis for the two-step flow theory of mass communication.

Contemporary debate 

In the times of digital social media, the more than six decade old theory sparks much new interest. The fact that massive databases are being used to send tailor-made messages to individuals lead back to the idea of a "one-step flow of communication". The idea is a kind of Hypodermic needle / magic bullet model, with the capacity of big data analytics informed mass customization. Empirical studies by other scholars, in contrast, have found that modern social media platforms, like Twitter, exhibit clear evidence of a two-step flow of communication (see Figure). Many social media users obtain their news from celebrities or other amplifying opinion leaders, who again get informed by mass media or by individuals with specific insights. The fine-grained digital footprint of social media also suggests that there are more than simply the one-step and two-step modes of communication flow, leading the search for more complex Multistep Flow Models based on distinct network structures.

Lazarsfeld and Katz 

Paul Lazarsfeld and Elihu Katz are considered to be the founders of functional theory and their book Personal Influence (1955) is considered to be the handbook to the theory.

Paul Felix Lazarsfeld 
One of the first to embark on Communications research, was the first to introduce the difference between 'administrative research' and 'critical research' in regards to the media. Critical research he believed, criticizes the media institutions themselves for the perspective ways they serve dominant social groups. Critical research favors interperspective and inductive methods of inquiry.

Lazarsfeld's study of the 1940 presidential election was published as The People's Choice (1944). During the research revealed information about the psychological and social processes that influence voting decisions. The study also uncovered an influence process that Lazarsfeld called "opinion leadership." He concluded that there is a multistep flow of information from the mass media to persons who serve as opinion leaders which then is passed on to the general public. He called this communication process the "two-step flow of communication".

Elihu Katz 
Elihu Katz was a psychologist in the School for Communication at the University of Pennsylvania when he collaborated with Lazarsfeld in 1955. Their research aimed to observe the flow of influence at the intersections of mass and interpersonal communication and resulted in the book Personal Influence. Katz pursued Lazarfeld's research in a study of the flow of information, which is the basis of Personal Influence. Katz and Lazarsfeld concluded that:
"... the traditional image of the mass persuasion process must make room for 'people' as intervening factors between the stimuli of the media and resultant opinions, decisions, and actions."

Published works on the theory

The People's Choice 
The presidential election of 1940 saw President Franklin Roosevelt seek an unprecedented third term in office. Funded by grants from the Rockefeller Foundation, Life magazine, and the pollster Elmo Roper, Columbia's Office of Radio Research conducted a study of voting. It was based on a panel study of 2,400 voters in Erie County, Ohio. Paul Lazarsfeld, Bernard Berelson, and Hazel Gaudet supervised 15 interviewers, who from May–October interviewed the strategically selected 2,400 members of the community several different times in order to document their decision making process during the campaign. They focused on what factors would influence their decisions as the campaign progressed. The People's Choice, a book based on this study presented the theory of  "the two-step flow of communications", which later came to be associated with the so-called "limited effects model" of mass media: the idea that ideas often flow from radio and print to local "opinion leaders" who in turn pass them on to those with more limited political knowledge, or "opinion followers." The results of the research led to the conclusion that sometimes person to person communication can be more effective than traditional media outlets such as newspapers, TV, radio etc. This idea developed further in the book Personal Influence.

Personal Influence 
In 1944, Paul Lazarsfeld contacted McFadden Publications in regards to his first book, The People's Choice. The two collaborated forming a mutually beneficial partnership in which Macfadden saw a way to financially profit from advertising to the female population and Lazarsfeld saw a way to gain more information on social influence. Out of this came the study conducted by the Bureau of Applied Social Research in which 800 female residents of Decatur, Illinois, where interviewed through panel interviews to discover what and who primarily influenced their decision making. Lazarsfeld worked with Robert Merton and thus hired C. Wright Mills to head the study. Another part of the research team, Thelma Ehrlich Anderson, trained local Decatur women to administer surveys to targeted women in town. By 1955. the Decatur study was published as part of Elihu Katz and Lazarsfeld's book Personal Influence. The book concluded that ultimately, face to face interaction is more influential than traditional media influence and thus confirmed the two-step flow model of communication.

Criticisms 
The original two-step flow hypothesis—that ideas flow from the media to opinion leaders and then to less active sections of the population—has been criticised. In 1960, conclusions from Deutschmann and Danielson assert, "we would urge that the Katz-Lazarsfeld two-stage flow hypothesis, as a description of the initial information process, be applied to mass communication with caution".

Everett Rogers' "Diffusion of Innovations" cites one study in which two-thirds of respondents accredited their awareness to the mass media rather than face-to-face communication. Similarly, critics argue that most of Lazarsfeld's findings pertain to learning factors involved with general media habits rather than the learning of particular information.

However, Lazarsfeld's two-step hypothesis is an adequate description to understand the media's influence on belief and behavior. Troldahl finds that media exposure is a first step to introduce discussion, at which point opinion leaders initiate the second-step flow.

According to Hilbert today's digital media landscape simultaneously facilitate one-step, two-step and more complex multi-step flow models of communication. For example, in Twitter networks it is no contradiction that average Twitter users mainly mention intermediating opinion leaders in their tweets (two-step flow), while at the same time traditional mass media outlets receive 80-90 % of their mentions directly through a direct one-step flow from the same users.

See also 
Word-of-mouth
Word-of-mouth marketing

References

External links 
 CIA Advertising article
 Universiteit Twente article
 The Long Road to Decatur: A History of Personal Influence - video by Glenda Balas (25mins)

Influence of mass media
Politics
Sociological theories
Mass media theories